The Utrecht–Rotterdam railway is a heavily used railway in the Netherlands, running from Utrecht to Rotterdam, passing through Woerden and Gouda. The line was opened between 1855 and 1858. The western terminus was originally the Rotterdam Maas station. In 1899, a connection with the Rotterdam Delftse Poort station (the present Rotterdam Centraal station) was made. In 1953 a new line was opened between Nieuwerkerk aan den IJssel station and Rotterdam Centraal station; the now obsolete Maas station was closed.

Stations
The main interchange stations on the Utrecht–Rotterdam railway are:

Utrecht Centraal: to Amsterdam, Zwolle, Arnhem and Eindhoven
Gouda: to The Hague and Leiden
Rotterdam Centraal: to The Hague, Breda, Brussels and Amsterdam

Railway lines in the Netherlands
Railway lines opened in 1858
1858 establishments in the Netherlands
Standard gauge railways in the Netherlands
Railway lines in Utrecht (province)
Railway lines in South Holland
Rail transport in Rotterdam
Rail transport in Utrecht (city)
19th-century architecture in the Netherlands